Galba is a genus of small air-breathing freshwater snails, aquatic pulmonate gastropod mollusks in the family Lymnaeidae, the pond snails.

The best-known species in the genus is Galba truncatula.

The genus Galba is known from the Jurassic to the Recent periods.

Species
Species within the genus Galba include:
 Galba bulimoides or Fossaria (Bakerilymnaea) bulimoides (I. Lea, 1841)
 Galba cousini (Jousseaume, 1887) 
 Galba cubensis (Pfeiffer, 1839) 
 Galba cyclostoma (Walker, 1908) (synonym: Fossaria cyclostoma (Walker, 1808))
 Galba dalli (F.C. Baker, 1907) 
 † Galba dupuyiana (Noulet, 1854) 
 Galba exigua (I. Lea, 1841) 
 Galba galbana Say, 1825) (synonym: Fossaria galbana Say, 1825)
 †Galba gaudryi Wenz, 1922
 † Galba halavatsi Wenz, 1922 
 Galba meridensis (Bargues, Artigas, Khoubbane & Mas-Coma, 2011)
 † Galba minor (Thomä, 1845) 
 Galba modicella (Say, 1825) 
 Galba neotropica (Bargues, Artigas, Mera y Sierra, Pointier & Mas-Coma, 2007)
 Galba obrussa (Say, 1825) 
 Galba parva (I. Lea, 1841)  (synonym: Fossaria parva (I.Lea, 1841))
 Galba pervia (Martens, 1867)
 Galba schirazensis Küster, 1862
 Galba sibirica (Westerlund, 1885)
 † Galba subminuta (Almera & Bofill y Poch, 1895) 
 † Galba suboblonga (Kovalenko, 1994)
 † Galba subpalustris - a fossil species from the late Miocene
 Galba viatrix (d'Orbigny, 1835) 
Subgenus Galba (Galba) Schrank, 1803
 † Galba (Galba) bulimoides (Klein, 1846) 
 † Galba (Galba) cornea (Brongniart, 1810) 
 † Galba (Galba) kenesensis (Halaváts, 1903) 
 † Galba (Galba) phrygopalustris (Oppenheim, 1919) 
 † Galba (Galba) praepalustris (Roman, 1907) 
 † Galba (Galba) sandbergeri (Łomnicki, 1886) 
 † Galba (Galba) subtruncatula (Clessin, 1885) 
 † Galba (Galba) suevica (Wenz, 1916) 
 Galba (Galba) truncatula (O. F. Müller, 1774) -  the type species
Species brought into synonymy
 † Galba dupuyana (Noulet, 1854): synonym of † Galba dupuyiana (Noulet, 1854) 
 † Galba jaccardi (Maillard, 1892): synonym of  †Stagnicola jaccardi (Maillard, 1892) 
 Galba montanensis F. C. Baker, 1913: synonym of Walterigalba montanensis (F. C. Baker, 1913)
 Galba occulta Jackiewicz, 1959: synonym of Ladislavella terebra (Westerlund, 1885)
 Galba pusilla Schrank, 1803: synonym of Galba truncatula (O. F. Müller, 1774)
 † Galba (Galba) armaniacensis (Noulet, 1857): synonym of † Stagnicola armaniacensis (Noulet, 1857) 
 † Galba (Galba) bouilleti (Michaud, 1855): synonym of † Stagnicola bouilleti (Michaud, 1855) 
 † Galba (Galba) glabra (Müller, 1774): synonym of † Omphiscola glabra (O. F. Müller, 1774) 
 † Galba (Galba) heriacensis (Fontannes, 1876): synonym of † Stagnicola bouilleti (Michaud, 1855) 
 † Galba (Galba) jaccardi (Maillard, 1892): synonym of † Stagnicola jaccardi (Maillard, 1892) 
 † Galba (Galba) kreutzii (Łomnicki, 1886): synonym of † Stagnicola kreutzii (Łomnicki, 1886) 
 Galba (Galba) palustris (Müller, 1774): synonym of Stagnicola palustris (O. F. Müller, 1774)
 † Galba (Galba) rouvillei (Fontannes, 1879): synonym of † Stagnicola bouilleti (Michaud, 1855) 
 † Galba (Galba) subfragilis (d'Orbigny, 1852): synonym of † Lymnaea subfragilis d'Orbigny, 1852 
 † Galba (Galba) subpalustris (Thomä, 1845): synonym of † Stagnicola subpalustris (Thomä, 1845)

References 

 Kruglov & Starobogatov, 1985) Vinarski V.M. (2013) One, two, or several? How many lymnaeid genera are there? Ruthenica 23(1): 41-58

External links 
 Guo-Hua Liu, Shu-Yan Wang, Wei-Yi Huang, Guang-Hui Zhao, Shu-Jun Wei, Hui-Qun Song, Min-Jun Xu, Rui-Qing Lin, Dong-Hui Zhou, Xing-Quan Zhu : The Complete Mitochondrial Genome of Galba pervia (Gastropoda: Mollusca), an Intermediate Host Snail of Fasciola spp; PLOS|One, July 26, 2012

 
Lymnaeidae